Alucita ussurica is a moth of the family Alucitidae. It is found in Russia (southern Primorie). The habitat consists of broad-leaved forests.

The wingspan is 10–13 mm. The ground colour of the adults is light-grey, with a pattern which is not contrasted. Adults have been recorded in June and July.

References

Moths described in 1999
Alucitidae
Moths of Asia